Greece competed at the 2020 Winter Youth Olympics in Lausanne, Switzerland from 9 to 22 January 2020.

Alpine skiing

Boys

Girls

Biathlon

Boys

Girls

Mixed

Cross-country skiing 

Boys

Girls

Freestyle skiing 

Ski cross

Snowboarding

Snowboard cross

See also
Greece at the 2020 Summer Olympics

References

2020 in Greek sport
Nations at the 2020 Winter Youth Olympics
Greece at the Youth Olympics